Welsh singer-songwriter Marina Diamandis, known mononymously as Marina and formerly by her stage name Marina and the Diamonds, has recorded songs for four studio albums and two extended plays. She first came to public prominence after being ranked in second place on the Sound of 2010 poll organised by the BBC. Her debut studio album The Family Jewels was released that February, and featured material from her first two extended plays, The Crown Jewels EP (2009) and The American Jewels EP (2010), in addition to newly recorded content. Diamandis co-wrote each of the album's thirteen tracks, including its five singles "Mowgli's Road", "Hollywood", "I Am Not a Robot", "Oh No!", and "Shampain". Songwriters and producers Liam Howe and Pascal Gabriel respectively co-wrote four and three tracks for the record. In 2009 and 2010, Diamandis recorded cover versions of the songs "What You Waiting For?" by Gwen Stefani and "Starstrukk" by 3OH!3, respectively.

Diamandis co-wrote each of the seventeen tracks featured on the standard, deluxe, and U.S. versions of her second studio album Electra Heart, which was released in March 2012. Its lead single "Primadonna" became her highest-charting track in the United Kingdom, peaking at number 11 on the UK Singles Chart. The song saw additional songwriting contributions from producers Dr. Luke and Cirkut, who collaborated again when co-writing the track "Lies". Rick Nowels frequently partnered with Diamandis during production of the record, and was consequently given writing credits on four songs from the project. Diamandis released the track "Just Desserts" featuring Charli XCX through SoundCloud and YouTube in May 2013, her first collaboration with another recording artist. Diamandis' previously-unreleased title track "Electra Heart" was released in May 2014, on which she is credited by online music stores as a featured artist alongside producer BetaTraxx. Diamandis' third studio album Froot (2015) is preceded by its title track, which was solely written by Diamandis.

Songs

References

Marina and the Diamonds